The Otoro Nuba are an ethnic group in the Nuba Mountains of South Kordofan state, in southern Sudan.

They speak Otoro language, a Niger-Congo language. The population of this group is approximately 12,000.

See also
Nuba peoples

References
Joshua Project

Nuba peoples
Ethnic groups in Sudan